Tan Kian Meng is a Malaysian badminton player who specializes in the doubles events. He is currently playing with Lai Pei Jing in mixed doubles. Originally a singles player, he switched to play in the doubles events since August 2014 due to slow career progress.

Achievements

Commonwealth Games 
Mixed doubles

Southeast Asian Games 
Mixed doubles

BWF World Tour (1 title, 1 runner-up) 
The BWF World Tour, which was announced on 19 March 2017 and implemented in 2018, is a series of elite badminton tournaments sanctioned by the Badminton World Federation (BWF). The BWF World Tour is divided into levels of World Tour Finals, Super 1000, Super 750, Super 500, Super 300 (part of the HSBC World Tour), and the BWF Tour Super 100.

Mixed doubles

BWF Grand Prix (3 titles, 3 runners-up) 
The BWF Grand Prix had two levels, the Grand Prix and Grand Prix Gold. It was a series of badminton tournaments sanctioned by the Badminton World Federation (BWF) and played between 2007 and 2017.

Mixed doubles

  BWF Grand Prix Gold tournament
  BWF Grand Prix tournament

BWF International Challenge/Series (3 runners-up) 
Men's doubles

Mixed doubles

  BWF International Challenge tournament
  BWF International Series tournament

References

External links 
 

1994 births
Living people
People from Johor Bahru
Malaysian sportspeople of Chinese descent
Malaysian male badminton players
Badminton players at the 2022 Commonwealth Games
Commonwealth Games gold medallists for Malaysia
Commonwealth Games bronze medallists for Malaysia
Commonwealth Games medallists in badminton
Competitors at the 2019 Southeast Asian Games
Southeast Asian Games silver medalists for Malaysia
Southeast Asian Games bronze medalists for Malaysia
Southeast Asian Games medalists in badminton
21st-century Malaysian people
Medallists at the 2022 Commonwealth Games